{{DISPLAYTITLE:C22H29NO3}}
The molecular formula C22H29NO3 may refer to:

 Cyprodime, an opioid antagonist from the morphinan family
 Norethisterone acetate oxime, a steroidal progestin of the 19-nortestosterone group